The 2015–16 Handball-Bundesliga was the 51st season of the Handball-Bundesliga, Germany's premier handball league and the 39th season consisting of only one league. It ran from 21 August 2015 to 5 June 2016.

Teams

A total of 18 teams were participating in this year's edition of the Bundesliga. Of these, 15 sides qualified directly from the 2014–15 season and the two sides were directly promoted from the 2014–15 2. Bundesliga season: SC DHfK Leipzig, the champions; ThSV Eisenach, the runners-up;  and the third-place finisher in the 2. Bundesliga, TV Bittenfeld.

Standings

Results

Top goalscorers

References

External links
Official website 

Handball-Bundesliga
2015–16 domestic handball leagues
2015 in German sport
2016 in German sport